Herpetopoma howensis is a species of sea snail, a marine gastropod mollusk in the family Chilodontidae.

Distribution
This marine species occurs in the Tasman Sea off Lord Howe Island.

References

External links
 To World Register of Marine Species

howensis
Gastropods described in 1994